Emma Cunniffe (born 3 July 1973) is an English film, stage and television actress.

Early life
Cunniffe was raised in Frodsham, Cheshire and attended Frodsham High School. She was in the local Frodsham panto group whilst growing up and was once in a pantomime with Gary Barlow. Originally it was dance she was into, until she went to theatre school at the age of 13 and fell in love with drama.

Career

Her television credits include Hetty Wainthrop Investigates (Chrissy in 'Safe as Houses', 1996),  The Lakes (BBC 1997, 1999), "Biddy" in a TV adaptation of Great Expectations, All the King's Men, Clash of the Santas, alongside Robson Green and Mark Benton, Clocking Off (BBC), and Flesh and Blood with Christopher Eccleston. She played DS Tina Murray in New Tricks (S3:E4 Diamond Geezers, 2006.). She also appeared in the sixth series Doctor Who episode "Night Terrors", alongside the Eleventh Doctor played by Matt Smith. She appeared in the BBC documentary The Genius of Mozart as Constanze, Wolfgang's wife. In 2009, she played Carol Boynton in the ITV adaptation of Appointment with Death, in series 11 of Agatha Christie's Poirot. In mid-2014, she played DS Hawthorn in Coronation Street, investigating the circumstances of the attack on and subsequent death of Tina McIntyre (Michelle Keegan) and on 5 January 2015, she played Kenzie Calhoun's mother, Ailsa in Waterloo Road

On stage, she won the UK Theatre Awards for Best Actress in a Supporting Role for her performance in The Master Builder in 2000. Her other stage work includes Tales from Hollywood, Losing Louis at the Trafalgar Studios in London and in 2006 Women Beware Women for the Royal Shakespeare Company in Stratford-upon-Avon. She was nominated for "what's on stage" award in 2011 for her role as Elizabeth Proctor in The Crucible at Open Air Theatre, Regent's Park.

In 2015 she appeared as Mabel Grayson in the BBC TV series Father Brown episode 3.9 "The Truth in the Wine". The same year, she appeared as the eponymous monarch in the RSC's production of Helen Edmundson's Queen Anne. In September 2019, she appeared in four episodes of Doctors as Dr Janet Fielding.

Personal life
Cunniffe lives in London with her husband, Rufus Jones, who she married in 2008.

Filmography

Film

Television

Theatre credits

References

External links

Living people
English television actresses
English stage actresses
1973 births
Actors from Chester